This is a list of the provinces of Spain by population and area.

Population and geography

Economy 
All provinces and islands of Spain by GDP and GDP per capita in 2015.

See also 
 Ranked lists of Spanish autonomous communities

References 

Spain
Municipalities of Spain